Camerata Mediterranea is a French and American nonprofit organization and an international, intercultural institute of musical exchanges. Camerata Mediterranea devotes itself to research, dialogue, and pedagogy involving the diverse musical civilizations of the Mediterranean basin, Christian, Jewish, and Muslim. It aims to revive the value of forgotten interactions and intends to reestablish a dialogue, at once artistic, intellectual and human, among civilizations.

Purpose
Camerata Mediterranea encourages research and communication among specialists and artists knowledgeable in the traditions of their respective civilizations.

In Europe, the old sources are written; in the East, the main source of transmission is oral. These different ways of conceiving and apprehending musical art create problems which the institute proposes to help overcome.

Camerata Mediterranea wishes to address these different traditions, largely separate today but sharing many common and ancient roots. Beyond the intrinsic interest and beauty of these musical languages, Camerata Mediterranea is of the opinion that the current historical moment calls forth new gestures of openness and of exchange.

Music
Camerata Mediterranea is especially concerned with early and traditional musical repertoires of southern Europe, Spanish and Iberic, and also Arabic, Arabo-Andalusian, Jewish, Ottoman, and other related repertoires of the Mediterranean basin and the Middle East.

Joel Cohen, one of the foremost authorities in the research and performance of medieval and early music, will direct the institute's programs. Much of his recent work has involved the music of early Iberia and its three religions.

History
As early as 1982, Joel and the Boston Camerata had developed a program called "The Sacred Bridge," exploring Jewish and Christian interactions during the Middle Ages. In 1988 Erato Records decided to make a recording of this program. Still in demand after more than two decades, the recording has recently been reissued on Warner Classics.

The "Sacred Bridge" program continues to tour internationally; most recently (April 2007) in Worcester, Massachusetts and Paris, France. Since its inception it has undergone considerable development, and now includes an important Arabic/Muslim component. Recent performances have been undertaken with the U.S.-based Sharq Arabic Music Ensemble

In 1997 Joel Cohen met the eminent Moroccan musician, Mohammed Briouel, for the first time. Their encounter gave birth to a major production, a selection of the thirteenth century Cantigas de Santa Maria, attributed to King Alfonso el Sabio, with European and Moroccan musicians collaborating. The recording, made in Fez, Morocco, was signed "Camerata Mediterranea," and included the participation of the Abdelkrim Rais orchestra of Fez, directed by Mr. Briouel.

The "Cantigas" recording won the coveted Edison Award in 2000, and has toured extensively in the United States, Morocco, Germany, the Netherlands, and France.

A Mediterranean Christmas, with the Boston Camerata and the Sharq Ensemble, is Joel Cohen's most recent production exploring shared roots and musical practices. Recorded in 2005 for Warner Classics, and enthusiastically greeted by the musical press, the production has also toured live in the United States and France.

In recent seasons Joel Cohen has also undertaken collaborations with Dünya, a Turkish music ensemble, and its leader, Mehmet Ali Sanlıkol. With Camerata Mediterranea and the Atrium of Chaville, he is planning a colloquium in early 2009 around the subject of cross-cultural Mediterranean musical interactions.

Activities
Camerata Mediterranea is prepared to function as an international production unit.

Activities to be organized may include:
 Colloquia, usually a week to several weeks, reuniting recognized scholar- specialists and professional musicians.
 On-campus workshops and seminars coordinated to university/high school curricula.
 Teaching semesters or mini-semesters.
 Language and poetry study sessions.
 Scholarships for proven professionals to study firsthand outside their field.

Camerata Mediterranea's first international colloquium was held in the French village of Saint-Guilhem-le-Désert, on June 26 and 27, 2009, and included participants from France, Spain, the United States, Turkey, Israel, and Morocco. Current plans,  in collaboration with the municipality of Saint-Guilhem,  are to make this colloquium a biennial event.

References

External links
Camerata Mediterranea website

International music organizations
Organizations established in 1982
1982 establishments in Massachusetts